Mañasu (Aymara for butcher, also spelled Mañazo) is a  mountain in the Andes of Bolivia. It is located in the Oruro Department, San Pedro de Totora Province. The Juch'us Jawira ("slim river") originates at the mountain. It flows to the northwest.

References 

Mountains of Oruro Department